Józef Chaciński (13 March 1889 – 6 May 1954) was a Polish lawyer and politician.

Chaciński was member of the Sejm from 1922 until 1930. During the Second World War, he was imprisoned in the German concentration camp Auschwitz( from 1940 until 1942). In 1945 he was arrested by the NKVD.

See also
  Trial of the Sixteen

1889 births
1954 deaths
Politicians from Warsaw
People from Warsaw Governorate
National League (Poland) members
Polish Christian Democratic Party politicians
Labor Party (Stronnictwo Pracy) politicians
Members of the Sejm of the Second Polish Republic (1922–1927)
Members of the Sejm of the Second Polish Republic (1928–1930)
Lawyers from Warsaw
Auschwitz concentration camp survivors
Polish people of World War II
Polish prisoners and detainees
Polish people detained by the NKVD